Zicaowu station is a station on Yanfang Line of the Beijing Subway. It was opened on 30 December 2017.

Station layout 
The station has an elevated island platform.

Exits 
There are 2 exits, lettered A and B. Both exits are accessible.

References 

Beijing Subway stations in Fangshan District